Kabuchai is a constituency in Kenya. It is one of nine constituencies in Bungoma County that has got nine wards in total.

Members Of Parliament

References 

Constituencies in Bungoma County